The Edinburgh Marathon is an annual marathon event, governed by Scottish Athletics and run in Scotland over the traditional distance of . The first marathon event in Edinburgh was in 1982. Further marathons were held in Edinburgh in 1986 and 1999. Since 2003 the Edinburgh Marathon Festival has been held each year, usually in May. The current route begins in the city centre, moves out of Edinburgh into East Lothian, finishing at Musselburgh, East Lothian.

History
On 5 September 1982, the Edinburgh Festival Marathon was the first mass marathon event to be held in the city. Starting in Holyrood Park and running through the Grassmarket and down Lothian Road, along Princes Street and down into Leith, along to Cramond and along the coast back through Silverknowes to Leith, up Easter Road and finishing in Meadowbank Stadium. The following year the race was called the Scotway Marathon and got off to an eventful start when a foolish fun-runner brought down the previous year's winner, breaking bones in the latter's hand. An Edinburgh Waverley Market Marathon was held on Sept 2nd 1984 with winner Lindsay Robertson in a then PB of 2:15:55. The Edinburgh Waverley Market Marathon again took place on Sept 1st 1985. Winner was M Carroll in 2:18:41.   In 1986 it was called the Commonwealth Games People's Marathon and held in June, a month ahead of the Commonwealth Games. In 1999 the PUMA Edinburgh Marathon was held, leaving from Dunfermline and finishing in Meadowbank Stadium, Edinburgh.

The Edinburgh Marathon Festival was founded by Geoff Sims and the first year's event on 15 June 2003, attracted just 3,000 participants. The course started at Meadowbank Stadium, taking in Princes Street, Holyrood Palace and the Royal Yacht Britannia. Frank McGowan from Glasgow won the men's race in 2.35 with the slowest man Lloyd Stott taking more than six days to complete the race wearing a deep sea diving suit weighing more than 100 pounds.

In 2007 organisers designed a new route, that headed into East Lothian through, Musselburgh, Prestonpans, Cockenzie, Port Seton to Gosford House, then back up to the finishing line at the playing fields at Pinkie St Peter's Primary School, Musselburgh. With an elevation drop of 40 metres, the average finish time was almost 12 minutes faster than previous year's Edinburgh earned its title of UK's fastest marathon. It was the first year that the event made a profit. Road closures for the new route affected around 130 streets.

In 2010, the half marathon was introduced for the first time with entry levels jumping to more than 24,000.

2011 was the first time the Edinburgh Marathon Festival was hosted over two days. As  well as the full marathon, the festival also included a 5K, 10K, two junior races and a half marathon and a team relay race, affectionately named the "Hairy Haggis."

The 2020 edition of the race was postponed to 30 May 2021 due to the coronavirus pandemic, then again to 29 May 2022.

Men's winners

Half Marathon

Women's winners

Half Marathon

Finisher statistics 

Total of runners finishing the original marathon distance

Criticism
Whilst the race starts in Edinburgh, less than eight miles of the course lie within the city boundaries, with the majority being run in East Lothian (including the Finish at Musselburgh). The course encompasses less than three miles of the city centre.

For the 2014 race, the organisers sent competitors details of their individual times but initially did not publish the full results, only giving times for the top three in each category. Within a few days, EMF events issued an apology via their website and published the full results.

Notes

References

External links
 

Recurring sporting events established in 2003
Marathon
Marathons in Scotland
Annual sporting events in the United Kingdom
2003 establishments in Scotland
Annual events in Edinburgh
Spring (season) events in Scotland